Mario Parodi (1917-1970) classical guitarist.

Mario Parodi was entirely self-taught, of Italian parents, born in Istanbul. 
Recorded are:  
Malaguena No. 3 From Suite Espana, Op. 165(Albeniz)
Vals nro.7 (Chopin)
Suenio de amor (Liszt)
Canção de cuna {Brahms} 
Para Elise, Bagatelle in A minor
Cradle Song, Op. 49, No. 4 {Brahms}
Waltz in A flat, Op. 69, No. 1
Allegro comodo from Fantasia (3rd Movement)
Study In Blue and White (Cantabile)
The Prophet Bird from Woodland Scenes, Op. 82

Music For Pleasure recordings
Mario Parodi Plays the Classical Guitar (Music For Pleasure, MFP2094)
Mario Parodi: Transcriptions for Classical Guitar (Music For Pleasure, MFP2140)
Mario Parodi: Guitare Classique (Music For Pleasure, MFP6018)

References or sources 

 (Registration required)

Classical guitarists
1917 births
1970 deaths